Clifford Everett "Bud" Shank, Jr. (May 27, 1926 – April 2, 2009) was an American alto saxophonist and flautist. He had an extensive career, releasing albums in seven different decades.

As leader 
 1954 The Compositions of Shorty Rogers (Nocturne)
 1954 Bud Shank and Three Trombones (Pacific)
 1955 The Saxophone Artistry of Bud Shank 
 1955 Bud Shank – Shorty Rogers – Bill Perkins (Pacific Jazz)
 1955 Bud Shank and Bob Brookmeyer (Pacific Jazz)
 1956 The Bud Shank Quartet (Pacific Jazz)
 1956 Live at the Haig (Candid)
 1956 Flute 'n Oboe (Pacific Jazz) – with Bob Cooper
 1956 Jazz at Cal-Tech (Pacific Jazz)
 1956 Theme Music from "The James Dean Story" (World Pacific)
 1956 Strings & Trombones (Pacific Jazz)
 1957 Jazz Swings Broadway (Pacific Jazz)
 1958 I'll Take Romance (World Pacific)
 1958 Misty Eyes (West Wind)
 1958 The Swing's to TV (Pacific Jazz)
 1958 Bud Shank and Bill Perkins ([Pacific Jazz)
 1958 Bud Shank in Africa (Pacific Jazz)
 1959 Holiday in Brazil (World Pacific)
 1959 Blowin' Country (World Pacific)
 1959 Latin Contrasts (World Pacific)
 1960 Bud Shank Plays Tenor (Pacific Jazz)
 1960 Slippery When Wet (World Pacific)
 1960 Koto & Flute (World Pacific)
 1961 Barefoot Adventure (Pacific Jazz)
 1961 New Groove (Pacific Jazz)
 1961 The Talents of Bud Shank (Kimberly)
 1961 Swinging Broadway (Kimberly)
 1962 Bossa Nova Jazz Samba (Pacific Jazz)
 1962 Improvisations (EMI Angel/Angel)
 1963 Brasamba! (Pacific Jazz)
 1963 Folk 'n Flute (World Pacific)
 1965 Bud Shank & His Brazilian Friends (Pacific Jazz)
 1966 Bud Shank & the Sax Section (Pacific Jazz)
 1966 Michelle (World Pacific)
 1966 Girl in Love (World Pacific)
 1966 Flute, Oboe and Strings (World Pacific)
 1966 California Dreamin' (World Pacific)
 1967 Brazil! Brazil! Brazil!
 1967 Bud Shank Plays Music from Today's Movies (World Pacific)
 1967 A Spoonful of Jazz (World Pacific)
 1968 Magical Mystery (World Pacific)
 1969 Windmills of Your Mind (Pacific Jazz)
 1970 Let It Be (World Pacific)
 1976 Sunshine Express (Concord Jazz)
 1978 Heritage (Concord Jazz)
 1979 Crystal Comments (Concord Jazz)
 1980 Explorations (Concord Jazz)
 1983 Yesterday, Today and Forever (Concord Jazz) – with Shorty Rogers
 1984 This Bud's for You... (Muse/32 Jazz)
 1985 California Concert (Contemporary) – with Shorty Rogers
 1986 That Old Feeling (Contemporary)
 1986 Bud Shank Quartet at Jazz Alley (Contemporary)
 1986 Serious Swingers (Contemporary) – with Bill Perkins
 1987 Quiet Fire (Contemporary) – with Frank Morgan [released 1991]
 1989 Tomorrow's Rainbow (Contemporary)
 1990 Tales of the Pilot: Bud Shank Plays the Music of David Peck (Capri)
 1990 Lost in the Stars: Bud Shank and Lou Levy Play the Sinatra Songbook (Fresh Sound)
 1990 Drifting Timelessly (Capri)
 1991 The Doctor Is In (Candid)
 1992 I Told You So (Candid)
 1992 The Awakening (New Edition/ Vertriebsges.mb)
 1995 New Gold (Candid)
 1995 Lost Cathedral (Itm)
 1996 Plays the Music of Bill Evans (Fresh Sound)
 1996 Bud Shank Sextet Plays Harold Arlen (Jimco)
 1997 Jazz in Hollywood (Original Jazz Classics)
 1997 By Request: Bud Shank Meets the Rhythm Section (Muse/Milestone)
 1998 A Flower Is a Lovesome Thing (Koch)
 1999 After You Jeru (Fresh Sound)
 2000 Silver Storm (Raw)
 2002 Plays Tenor (Toshiba)
 2002 On the Trail (Raw)
 2003 Cool Fool (Fresh Sound)
 2005 Bouncing with Bud and Phil (Capri)
 2006 Taking the Long Way Home (Jazzed Media)
 2006 Brazilliance, Vol. 1/Concert Creations for Guitar (FiveFour)
 2007 Beyond the Red Door (Jazzed Media)
 2009 Fascinating Rhythms (Jazzed Media)
 2011 In Good Company (Capri)

As sideman 

With Laurindo Almeida
 Laurindo Almeida Quartet Featuring Bud Shank (Pacific, 1955) – re-released as Brazilliance on World Pacific, 1961
 Holiday in Brasil with Bud Shank (World Pacific, 1959) – re-released in 1962 as Brazilliance Vol. 2, and in Europe as Jazz Goes Brazil on Fontana
 Latin Contrasts with Bud Shank as labeled leader, arrangements by Laurindo Almeida (World Pacific, 1959) – re-released in 1963 as Brazilliance Vol. 3

With Chet Baker
 Witch Doctor (Contemporary, 1985) – rec. 1953
 The Trumpet Artistry of Chet Baker (Pacific Jazz, 1954)
 Chet Baker & Strings (Columbia, 1954)
 Chet Baker Sings and Plays (Pacific Jazz, 1955)
 Chet Baker Big Band (Pacific Jazz, 1956)
Theme Music from "The James Dean Story"  (World Pacific, 1957)

With Gene Clark
 Roadmaster (Ariola, 1972)
 Firebyrd (Takoma, 1984)

With Buddy Collette
 Buddy Collette's Swinging Shepherds (EmArcy, 1958)
 At the Cinema! (Mercury, 1959)

With Maynard Ferguson
 Maynard Ferguson's Hollywood Party (EmArcy, 1954)
 Dimensions (EmArcy, 1955)
 Around the Horn with Maynard Ferguson (EmArcy, 1956)

With Jimmy Giuffre
 Jimmy Giuffre (Capitol, 1955)
 The Jimmy Giuffre Clarinet (Atlantic, 1956)
 Herb Ellis Meets Jimmy Giuffre with Herb Ellis (Verve, 1959)

With Stan Kenton
 Innovations in Modern Music (Capitol, 1950)
 Stan Kenton Presents (Capitol, 1950)
 Popular Favorites by Stan Kenton (Capitol, 1953)
 This Modern World (Capitol, 1953)
 The Kenton Era (Capitol, 1955) – rec. 1940–54
 Lush Interlude (Capitol, 1958)
 Stan Kenton Conducts the Los Angeles Neophonic Orchestra (Capitol, 1965)
 Hair (Capitol, 1969)

With Shelly Manne
 The West Coast Sound (Contemporary, 1955)
 Manne–That's Gershwin! (Capitol, 1965)
 Daktari (Atlantic, 1967)

With Gerry Mulligan
 I Want to Live (United Artists, 1958)
 Gene Norman Presents the Original Gerry Mulligan Tentet and Quartet (GNP, 1997) – rec. 1953

With Shorty Rogers
 Cool and Crazy (RCA Victor, 1953)
 Shorty Rogers Courts the Count (RCA Victor, 1954)
 Collaboration with André Previn (RCA Victor, 1954)
 Martians Come Back! (Atlantic, 1955 [1956])
 Way Up There (Atlantic, 1955 [1957])
 Afro-Cuban Influence (RCA Victor, 1958)
 Chances Are It Swings (RCA Victor, 1958)
 The Wizard of Oz and Other Harold Arlen Songs (RCA Victor, 1959)
 Shorty Rogers Meets Tarzan (MGM, 1960)
 The Swingin' Nutcracker (RCA Victor, 1960) 
 An Invisible Orchard (RCA Victor, 1997) – rec. 1961
 The Fourth Dimension in Sound (Warner Bros., 1961)
 Bossa Nova (Reprise, 1962)
 Jazz Waltz (Reprise, 1962)

With Pete Rugolo
 Introducing Pete Rugolo (Columbia, 1954)
 Adventures in Rhythm (Columbia, 1954)
 Rugolomania (Columbia, 1955)
 Out on a Limb (EmArcy, 1956)
 New Sounds by Pete Rugolo (Harmony, 1957) – rec. 1954–55
 An Adventure in Sound: Reeds in Hi-Fi (Mercury, 1958) – rec. 1956
 Rugolo Plays Kenton (EmArcy, 1958)
 The Music from Richard Diamond (EmArcy, 1959)
 Behind Brigitte Bardot (Warner Bros., 1960)
 The Original Music of Thriller (Time, 1961)
 10 Saxophones and 2 Basses (Mercury, 1961)

With Lalo Schifrin
 Music from Mission: Impossible (Dot, 1967)
 There's a Whole Lalo Schifrin Goin' On (Dot, 1968)
 More Mission: Impossible (Paramount, 1968)
 Mannix (Paramount, 1968)
 Bullitt (soundtrack) (Warner Bros., 1968)
 Che! (soundtrack) (Tetragrammaton, 1969)
 Kelly's Heroes (soundtrack) (MGM, 1970)

With Gerald Wilson
 Moment of Truth (Pacific Jazz, 1962)
 Portraits (Pacific Jazz, 1964)
 On Stage (Pacific Jazz, 1965)

With others
 Elmer Bernstein, The Man with the Golden Arm (Decca, 1956)
 Buddy Bregman, Swinging Kicks (Verve, 1957)
 The Charlie Byrd Trio, Brazilville (1981)
 Nat King Cole, L-O-V-E (Capitol, 1965)
 Ron Elliott, The Candlestickmaker (1970)
 Clare Fischer, Extension (Pacific Jazz, 1963)
 Richard "Groove" Holmes,* Six Million Dollar Man,  (RCA/Flying Dutchman, 1975)
 Barney Kessel, Easy Like (Contemporary, 1953)
 The Mamas & the Papas, California Dreamin' (RCA Victor, 1965)
 Sérgio Mendes, Brasil '65 (1965)
 Hugo Montenegro, Colours of Love (RCA Victor, 1970)
 Oliver Nelson, Skull Session (Flying Dutchman, 1975)
 Harry Nilsson, Duit on Mon Dei (1975)
 Jack Nitzsche, Heart Beat: Soundtrack (Capitol, 1980)
 Anita O'Day, Cool Heat (Verve, 1959)
 Patti Page, In the Land of Hi-Fi (EmArcy, 1956)
 Boz Scaggs, Silk Degrees (Columbia, 1976)
 Ravi Shankar, Improvisations (World Pacific, 1962)
 Gábor Szabó and Bob Thiele, Light My Fire (Impulse!, 1967)
 Julie London, All Through the Night: Julie London Sings the Choicest of Cole Porter (Liberty, 1965)

References

External Links
 

Discographies of American artists
Jazz discographies